John Joseph Feenan (1 July 1914 – October 1994) was an Irish and Northern Irish footballer who played for Belfast Celtic, Sunderland and Shelbourne. As an international he also played for Ireland. In the 1940s he served as manager of Shelbourne. He was born in Newry, Ireland.

Early years
Feenan began his career with his local team, Newry Town, before moving to Belfast Celtic in 1932 in a transfer deal that also saw Tommy Breen moving from Town to Celtic.

Sunderland
Feenan made his English League debut for Sunderland on 19 September 1936 in a 4-1 win against Brentford at Roker Park. He made his final league appearance for the club on 6 May 1939 in an away game against Wolverhampton Wanderers which finished as a 0-0 draw. Feenan made 28 league appearances for Sunderland and played 1 further game for the club in the FA Cup. Among his teammates at the club were Raich Carter and Johnny Mapson.

Shelbourne
After leaving Sunderland, Feenan returned to Ireland and played for Shelbourne. On 28 April 1940, while at Shelbourne, he played for a League of Ireland XI that also included Paddy Bradshaw, Jimmy Dunne and Johnny Carey, which lost 3-2 to a Scottish League XI at Dalymount Park 
. Between 1942 and 1946 Feenan also served as Shels manager.

Ireland international
When Feenan played international football in 1937 there were, in effect, two Ireland teams, chosen by two rival associations. Both associations, the Northern Ireland - based IFA and the Irish Free State - based FAI claimed jurisdiction over the whole of Ireland and selected players from the whole island. Feenan was one of several players born in Northern Ireland who benefited from the FAI's attempts to establish an all-Ireland influence.

In 1937, while playing for Sunderland, Feenan won 2 caps for Ireland. In May of that year the FAI organised a European tour with a squad that included Feenan and two other Northerners, Jackie Brown and Davy Jordan. He made his debut for the FAI XI on 17 May in a 1-0 win against Switzerland. A week later, on 23 May, he also helped the FAI XI defeat France 2-0. These would prove to be Feenan's only international appearances.
 Feenan died in Gloucestershire in October 1994 at the age of 80.

References

1914 births
1994 deaths
Belfast Celtic F.C. players
Association football defenders
League of Ireland managers
League of Ireland players
Irish Free State international footballers
NIFL Premiership players
Association footballers from Northern Ireland
Republic of Ireland international footballers from Northern Ireland
Sportspeople from Newry
Shelbourne F.C. managers
Shelbourne F.C. players
Sunderland A.F.C. players
English Football League players
League of Ireland XI players
Football managers from Northern Ireland